Braslaw Lakes (tr. Braslawskiya azyory) is one of the four national parks in Belarus. The national park was set up in September 1995. It is a unique ecosystem with a number of lakes and a large area of pine forests. This includes 30 lakes. Three largest lakes are Dryvyaty (fifth largest in the country), Snudy (ninth largest in the country) and Strusta (sixteenth largest in the country).

Location
The territory of the national park is separate and is in the Braslaw Raion in the northwest of Belarus, near the border with Lithuania. In the north it is adjacent to Belarusian-Latvian border. The park is elongated from southwest to northeast. The southern part of the park consists of lowlands covered with forests. Much of the area is occupied by different types of bogs. There are several beautiful forest lakes, including Boginskoye - considered to be one of the most beautiful in the Braslav area. The forests here belong to coniferous-deciduous group, and occupy . One can distinguish the following woodlands: Borunsky, Belmont, Boguinsky, Druiskaya Dacha. Pine woods and fir woods are widespread.

History
Through the latest glacial period, about 18,000-29,000 years ago, the area of Braslav Lakes was covered with vast ice fields, up to several hundred metres thick. As the climate warmed, the ice slowly melted and the limit of the ice moved north. This complex process shaped the characteristic features of the nature of Poozerye with its hilly relief and lakes.

Geography
The biggest lakes are Drivyaty, Snudy, Strusto, Voiso, Volosovo, Nedrovo, Nespish, and Berezhe. This group of lakes makes up the core of the Braslav Lakes National Park.

Animals and plants 
Of the rare species listed in the Belarusian Red Book, the area is the home of the  badger, lynx, brown bear, and swan. The swan was almost extinct in this area but now inhabits the Braslav lakes. Other native species include the black stork, common crane, silver seagull, willow grouse, and dunlin. The lakes of Braslav are rich with different kinds of fish. Pike perch, bream, whitebait, tench, whitefish are widespread. Eel is of special value. Also widespread are boar, roe deer, squirrel, brown and white hare, fox, raccoon, wolf, marten, otter, and mink.

See also
Lake Abakrytseli
Lake Ikazn
Lake Ilmenak

References

External links
 The Braslav National Park home page
 Braslav Lakes National Park

National parks of Belarus
Lake groups of Belarus
Lakes of Vitebsk Region
Tourist attractions in Vitebsk Region
Protected areas established in 1995
Braslaw District